David Martínez Álvarez (born 30 July 1985), better known by his stage name Rayden, is a Spanish rapper.

Career 
Rayden was a member of rap groups A3Bandas and Crew Cuervos.

In 2006, Rayden won the freestyle rap competition Red Bull Batalla de los Gallos. He participated again in 2009, and was eliminated in the semi-finals.

Rayden released his first solo studio album, Estaba escrito, in 2010. His second album, Mosaico, was published in 2012, and the third, En alma y hueso, was released in 2014.

His fourth studio album, Antónimo (2017) initiated a trilogy completed by Sinónimo (2019) and Homónimo (2021).

In November 2021, Rayden headlined a concert at the WiZink Center in Madrid dedicated to his twentieth anniversary as an artist.

In December 2021, he was selected to participate in the first edition of Benidorm Fest, the song festival organised to determine 's entry for the Eurovision Song Contest, with the song "Calle de la llorería". He finished in fourth place.

Discography

Albums

Awards and nominations

References

Singers from the Community of Madrid
Spanish male rappers
Living people
Benidorm Fest contestants
1985 births